The TAC Stark is a four-wheel drive vehicle manufactured by Tecnologia Automotiva Catarinense. This project came about through an initiative of Federação das Indústrias do Estado de Santa Catarina or FIESC (Federation of Industries of the State of Santa Catarina), on the grounds that Santa Catarina had many parts producers but no automakers.

Powerplant
The engine that powers the Stark Flex is the FTP 2.3L 16V Turbo Diesel Intercooler, one of the two standard van engines installed by Fiat and Iveco, supplied by FPT - FIAT Powertrain Technologies, the largest manufacturer of propulsion systems in Latin America. Developed and manufactured in Italy, the engine is also produced in TAG's Brazilian plant in Sete Lagoas (MG) from 2009.

See also
 Troller

References

External links
 TAC Motors official page 
 TAC Stark Page  
 TAC Stark article at worldcarfans.com
 TAC Stark article at autoblog.com
 TAC Stark viseos on YouTube

Cars of Brazil
All-wheel-drive vehicles
Mini sport utility vehicles